Wayne R. Bock Jr. (May 28, 1934 – September 11, 2016) is a former American football player who played for the Chicago Cardinals of the National Football League (NFL). He played college football at the University of Illinois at Urbana–Champaign.

References

1934 births
2016 deaths
American football defensive tackles
Illinois Fighting Illini football players
Chicago Cardinals players